This is a list of properties and districts in Grady County, Georgia that are listed on the National Register of Historic Places (NRHP).

Current listings

|}

References

Grady
Buildings and structures in Grady County, Georgia